Jeannette is a fictional character in the . She first appeared in Secret Six #3 (January 2009), and was created by Gail Simone and Nicola Scott.

Publication history
Jeannette was introduced in the fourth issue of the ongoing Secret Six comic book as the sixth—and most recent—addition to the team, whose roster had changed many times over since its inception.

Fictional character biography
Jeannette is a white haired banshee who dresses in Revolutionary France era clothing. Jeannette was born into a family of impoverished nobility, and as a child was sent to serve Countess Elizabeth Báthory, a murderess. As the Countess's "favorite", Jeannette was forced to watch every murder with the intent of being Báthory's final victim. When the Countess was imprisoned, Jeannette was assigned to care for her, and used the position to slowly murder Báthory by placing ground glass in her food.

As an adult she became a wealthy married socialite. However, her husband betrayed her to the Revolution and caused Jeannette to become the victim of a botched execution, which led to her mortal death. She describes the ordeal here:

In her first appearance several centuries later, Jeannette is shown to run a casino in Las Vegas, Nevada. Her status as a villain was not made explicit, but due to her apparent relationship with her soon-to-be teammate Scandal Savage, it is implied that she had engaged in some unsavory business prior to her introduction. Eventually, she is shown to have been detained in several prisons over the course of her long life for unspecified crimes.

Jeannette displays an immediate attraction to teammate Deadshot, and the two begin an affair. At one point, Deadshot injures Jeannette in an apparent betrayal of the team, but this turns out to be a necessary act in order to save them. Their relationship suffers another blow later, when Deadshot shoots Jeannette after she threatens to break a contract the team has entered into with a group of slavers by rescuing the imprisoned Amazon Artemis, whom she is shown to have met previously. According to creator Gail Simone, "Jeannette was so busy doing Deadshot all the time, people forgot she's bi!"

Powers and abilities

While the full extent of her sound-manipulating abilities have yet to be depicted, Jeannette has shown to possess at least some characteristics of the mythological banshee, including long-life and  a "death sense", which causes her irises to become black when someone nearby will die. She has been shown to be a whole lot stronger physically than a normal human, snapping iron locks and chains with her bare hands alone, and at one point throwing an airplane wing at an enemy. 

She also possesses a high durability level as she was punched through a stone wall and merely shrugged off the experience. On another occasion she was shot at several times, which only slowed her down temporarily. She appears to be trained in combat as well. When tapping into her full Banshee persona, Jeannette transforms into a black and white being, very similar to the Silver Banshee. Her high pitched scream causes those around her to relive her mortal death, causing those listening to either fall into a comatose state or die themselves.

References

External links
Jeannette at Comic Vine

Characters created by Gail Simone
Comics characters introduced in 2009
DC Comics characters who are shapeshifters
DC Comics characters with accelerated healing
DC Comics characters with superhuman strength
DC Comics demons
DC Comics female supervillains
DC Comics LGBT supervillains
Fictional bisexual females
Fictional characters who can manipulate sound
Fictional characters with precognition
Fictional characters with slowed ageing
Fictional characters with superhuman durability or invulnerability
Fictional Hungarian people
Vigilante characters in comics
Fictional socialites
Banshees